

Events

January–February 

 January 4 – Explorer Aeneas Mackintosh of the Imperial Trans-Antarctic Expedition escaped death by fleeing across ice floes.
 January 7 – Colombia recognizes the independence of Panama.
 January 9 – The British Nimrod Expedition to the South Pole, led by Ernest Shackleton, arrives at the farthest south reached by any prior expedition, at 88°23' S, prior to turning back due to diminishing supplies.
 January 16 – Shackleton's expedition claims to have found the magnetic South Pole (but the location recorded may be incorrect).
 January 24 – The White Star Liner RMS Republic sinks the day after a collision with SS Florida off Nantucket.
 January 28 – The last United States troops leave Cuba, after being there since the Spanish–American War of 1898.
 February 2 – The Paris Film Congress opens. It is an attempt to create a cartel of leading European producers similar to the MPPC in the United States.
 February 5 – Leo Baekeland announces the creation of bakelite hard thermosetting plastic.

March–April 

 March 4 – Inauguration of William Howard Taft as the 27th President of the United States.
 March 10 – The Anglo-Siamese Treaty of 1909 is signed in Bangkok.
 March 18 – Einar Dessau uses a shortwave radio transmitter in Denmark.
 March 21 – The remains of the Báb are placed in the Baháʼí Shrine of the Báb on Mount Carmel in Haifa, at this time within the Ottoman Empire.
 March 31 – Serbia accepts Austrian control over Bosnia and Herzegovina.
 April 4 – The association football team Sport Club Internacional is founded in Porto Alegre, Brazil.
 April 6 – Robert Peary, Matthew Henson, and four Inuit explorers, Ootah, Ooqueah, Seegloo, and Egigingwah, come within a few miles of the North Pole.
 April 11 – The city of Tel Aviv (known in its first year as Ahuzat Bayit) is founded by the Jewish community, on the outskirts of Jaffa.
 April 13 (March 31 by Eastern reckoning) – A countercoup begins in the Ottoman Empire.
 April 14 – Adana massacre: Ottoman Turks kill 15,000–30,000 Armenian Christians, in the Adana Vilayet.
 April 18 – Joan of Arc is beatified in Rome.
 April 19 – The Anglo-Persian Oil Company (modern-day BP) is incorporated.
 April 27 – Sultan of the Ottoman Empire Abdul Hamid II is overthrown and succeeded by his brother, Mehmed V. He is sent to the Ottoman port city of Thessaloniki (Selanik) the next day.

May–June 

 May 19 – Russian ballet is brought to the Western world, when the Ballets Russes opens a tour produced by Sergei Diaghilev at the Théâtre du Châtelet in Paris, with 55 dancers, including Vaslav Nijinsky.
 June 2 – French forces capture Abéché, capital of the Wadai Empire in central Africa.
 June 15 – Representatives from England, Australia and South Africa meet at Lord's Cricket Ground, and form the Imperial Cricket Conference.

July–August 

 July 1 – In Great Britain, Indian student nationalist Madan Lal Dhingra assassinates Sir William Curzon Wyllie, political aid to the Secretary of State for India. This is an notable early escalation of violence in the Indian nationalist movement overseas. 
 July 16 – A revolution forces Mohammad Ali Shah of the Qajar dynasty to abdicate in favor of his son Ahmad Shah Qajar. He proceeds to leave Persia for Imperial Russia, reportedly seeking the assistance of Nicholas II of Russia in regaining the throne.
 July 25 – Louis Blériot is the first man to fly across the English Channel (thus a large open body of water) in a heavier-than-air craft.
 July 25–August 2 – "Tragic Week" (la Setmana Tràgica): The city of Barcelona experiences a workers' uprising.
 July 26 – Blue Anchor Line passenger/cargo liner , on her second voyage from Australia to Britain, leaves Durban and is lost without trace with all 211 aboard.
 August 2 – The United States Army Signal Corp Division purchases the world's first military airplane, a Wright Military Flyer, from the Wright brothers.
 August 8 – Max Heindel formally founds the Rosicrucian Fellowship in Seattle, Washington.

September–October 

 September 4 – Japan and China sign the Gando Convention, which gives Japan a way to receive railroad concessions in Manchuria.
 October – Suzuki Weaving Machine Manufacturing, predecessor of the Suzuki motorbike and compact car brand in Japan, is founded in Shizuoka Prefecture.
 October 8 – An earthquake in the Zagreb area leads Andrija Mohorovičić to identify the Mohorovičić discontinuity.
 October 12 – The association football team Coritiba is founded in Curitiba, Brazil.
 October 13 – An agreement by Germany, Italy and Switzerland gives the Germans and Italians access to the Gotthard Rail Tunnel.
 October 16 – The Pittsburgh Pirates defeat the Detroit Tigers to win the 1909 World Series.
 October 26 – Itō Hirobumi, four time Prime Minister of Japan (the 1st, 5th, 7th and 10th) and Resident-General of Korea, is assassinated by An Jung-geun, an activist of the Korean independence movement, at the Harbin railway station in Manchuria.

November–December 

 November 18 – In Nicaragua, 500 revolutionaries (including 2 Americans) are executed by order of dictator José Santos Zelaya. The United States responds by sending 2 warships.
 November 28 – Sergei Rachmaninoff's Piano Concerto No. 3 is premièred in New York City with the composer as soloist.
 December 4 – Montreal Canadiens, a well known professional ice hockey club in Canada, is founded.
 December 14 – New South Wales Premier Charles Wade signs the Seat of Government Surrender Act 1909, formally completing the transfer of State land to the Commonwealth, to create the Australian Capital Territory.
 December 19 – The association football team Borussia Dortmund is founded in Dortmund, Germany.
 December 23 – King Albert I of Belgium succeeds his uncle, Leopold II (died December 17), on the throne.
 December 28 – The first manned heavier-than-air powered flight in South Africa is made at East London, by French aviator Albert Kimmerling, in a Voisin 1907 biplane.

Undated 
 Karl Landsteiner, Constantin Levaditi and Erwin Popper first isolate the poliovirus.

Births

January to April

January 

 January 1 
 Dana Andrews, American actor (d. 1992)
 Stepan Bandera, Ukrainian nationalist leader (d. 1959)
 January 2 – Barry Goldwater, American politician (d. 1998)
 January 3 – Victor Borge, Danish entertainer (d. 2000)
 January 4 – J. R. Simplot, American businessman (d. 2008)
 January 5 – Stephen Cole Kleene, American mathematician (d. 1994)
 January 8 – Willy Millowitsch, German actor (d. 1999)
 January 9
 Anthony Mamo, 1st President of Malta (d. 2008)
 Patrick Peyton, American priest, saint (d. 1992)
 January 13 – Marinus van der Lubbe, Dutch communist convicted of setting fire to the German Reichstag building in 1933 (d. 1934)
 January 15 
 Jean Bugatti, German-born automobile designer (d. 1939)
 Gene Krupa, American drummer (d. 1973)
 January 16 – Clement Greenberg, American art critic (d. 1994)
 January 19 – Hans Hotter, German bass-baritone (d. 2003)
 January 21 – Todor Skalovski, Macedonian composer (d. 2004)
 January 22 
 Porfirio Rubirosa, Dominican diplomat, race-car driver, and polo player (d. 1956)
 Ann Sothern, American actress (d. 2001)
 U Thant, Burmese United Nations Secretary General (d. 1974)
 January 24 – Martin Lings, British Islamic scholar (d. 2005)
 January 25 – Robert Rex, 1st Premier of Niue (d. 1992)
 January 28 – Colin Munro MacLeod, Canadian-American geneticist, medical researcher (d. 1972)
 January 30 – Saul Alinsky, American community organizer (d. 1972)

February 

 February 1 – George Beverly Shea, American gospel singer, songwriter (d. 2013)
 February 3 – Simone Weil, French philosopher (d. 1943)
 February 6 – Aino Talvi, Estonian actress (d. 1992) 
 February 7
 Wilhelm Freddie, Danish painter (d. 1995)
 Amedeo Guillet, Italian army officer (d. 2010)
 Silvio Zavala, Mexican historian (d. 2014)
 February 9 
 Marjorie Ogilvie Anderson, Scottish historian (d. 2002)
 Harald Genzmer, German composer (d. 2007)
 Carmen Miranda, Portuguese-born Brazilian actress, singer (d. 1955)
 Giulio Racah, Israeli mathematician, physicist (d. 1965)
 Dean Rusk, American politician (d. 1994)
 February 11
 Max Baer, American boxer, actor (d. 1959)
 Joseph Mankiewicz, American filmmaker (d. 1993)
Saturnino de la Fuente García, Spanish supercentenarian, world's oldest living man from 2021 to 2022 (d. 2022)
 February 12 – Zoran Mušič, Slovene painter (d. 2005)
 February 14 – Beatrice Miller, American singer, actress (d. 1999)
 February 15 
 Miep Gies, Austrian-born Dutch humanitarian (d. 2010)
 Guillermo Gorostiza Paredes, Spanish footballer (d. 1966)
 February 16
 Hugh Beaumont, American actor (d. 1982)
 Jeffrey Lynn, American actor, film producer (d. 1995)
 February 18 
 Matti Järvinen, Finnish athlete (d. 1985)
 Wallace Stegner, American writer (d. 1993)
 February 19 – Enrico Donati, Italian-born American painter (d. 2008)
 February 20 – Heinz Erhardt, German comedian, musician, entertainer, actor, and poet (d. 1979)
 February 21 – Hans Erni, Swiss painter, sculptor (d. 2015)
 February 22 – Edmund Berkeley, American scientist (d. 1988)
 February 24 – August Derleth, American writer (d. 1971)
 February 25 – Geoffrey Dummer, English electrical engineer (d. 2002)
 February 26 – King Talal of Jordan (d. 1972)
 February 28 – Stephen Spender, English writer (d. 1995)

March 

 March 4 – Harry Helmsley, American real estate entrepreneur (d. 1997)
 March 7 – Roger Revelle, American scientist, scholar (d. 1991)
 March 10 – Henrietta Buckmaster, American activist, journalist, and author (d. 1983)
 March 12 – Virginia McLaurin, American community service volunteer (d. 2022)
 March 19 
 Jean Brachet, Belgian chemist (d. 1988)
 Louis Hayward, South African-born actor (d. 1985)
 March 22
 Milt Kahl, American animator (d. 1987)
 Gabrielle Roy, Canadian author (d. 1983)
 March 24 – Clyde Barrow, American outlaw, member of Barrow Gang (d. 1934)
 March 26
 Héctor José Cámpora, Argentine Peronist politician, 38th President of Argentina (d. 1980)
 Chips Rafferty, Australian actor (d. 1971) 
 March 27 – Golo Mann, German historian (d. 1994)
 March 28 – Nelson Algren, American author (d. 1981)
 March 29 – Moon Mullican, American country music singer (d. 1967)

April 

 April 6 – William M. Branham, American Christian minister (d. 1965)
 April 7 – Robert Charroux, French writer (d. 1978)
 April 8 – John Fante, Italian-American writer (d. 1983)
 April 13 
 Stanislaw Marcin Ulam, Polish-born mathematician (d. 1984)
 Eudora Welty, American author (d. 2001)
 April 22 
 Rita Levi-Montalcini, Italian neurologist, Nobel Prize laureate (d. 2012)
 Spyros Markezinis, Prime Minister of Greece (d. 2000)
 Indro Montanelli, Italian journalist (d. 2001)
 April 24 
 Bernhard Grzimek, German zoo director, zoologist (d. 1987)
 April 25 – William Pereira, American architect (d. 1985)
 April 26
 Marianne Hoppe, German actress (d. 2002)
 Rodney Collin, British writer (d. 1956)
 April 27 – Guillermo León Valencia, 21st President of Colombia (d. 1971)
 April 27 – Tom Ewell, American actor and producer (d. 1994)
 April 30
 Queen Juliana of the Netherlands (d. 2004)
 F. E. McWilliam, Northern Irish sculptor (d. 1992)

May to August

May 

 May 1 – Yiannis Ritsos, Greek poet, activist (d. 1990)
 May 4 – Howard Da Silva, American actor (d. 1986)
 May 6 – Loyd Sigmon, American amateur radio broadcaster (d. 2004)
 May 7 – Edwin H. Land, American camera inventor (d. 1991)
 May 10 – Maybelle Carter, American musician (d. 1978)
 May 15
 James Mason, British actor (d. 1984)
 Clara Solovera, Chilean folk musician (d. 1992)
 May 16 – Margaret Sullavan, American actress (d. 1960)
 May 17 – Karl Schäfer, Austrian figure skater (d. 1976)
 May 18 – Fred Perry, English tennis player (d. 1995)
 May 19 – Nicholas Winton, British humanitarian (d. 2015)
 May 23 – Hugh E. Blair, American linguist (d. 1967)
 May 24 – Victoria Hopper, Canadian stage, film actress and singer (d. 2007)
 May 26
 Matt Busby, Scottish football manager (d. 1994)
 Adolfo López Mateos, 48th President of Mexico (d. 1969)
 Papa Charlie McCoy, American Delta blues musician, songwriter (d. 1950)
 Maria Ripamonti, Italian Roman Catholic and a professed religious from the Ancelle della carità (d. 1954)
 May 27 
 Dolores Hope, American singer, philanthropist (d. 2011)
 Guillermo León Valencia, President of Colombia (d. 1971)
 Donald Trumbull, American special effects artist (d. 2004)
 Juan Vicente Pérez, Venezuelan farmer and supercentenarian, oldest living man, last man born in 1900s
 May 30 – Benny Goodman, American musician (d. 1986)
 May 31 – John Spencer-Churchill, English painter, sculptor and a stockbroker (d. 1992)

June 

 June 1 – Yechezkel Kutscher, Slovakian-born Israeli philologist, Hebrew linguist (d. 1971)
 June 3 – Ira D. Wallach, American businessman, philanthropist (d. 2007)
 June 6 – Isaiah Berlin, Russian historian of ideas (d. 1997)
 June 7 – Jessica Tandy, English actress (d. 1994)
 June 10 – Mary Field, American film actress (d. 1996)
 June 12
Archie Bleyer, American song arranger, band leader (d. 1989)
Tom Steele, Scottish-born actor, stuntman (d. 1990)
 June 14 – Burl Ives, American singer (d. 1995)
 June 19 – Osamu Dazai, Japanese novelist (d. 1948)
 June 20
Errol Flynn, Australian-born actor (d. 1959)
Robb White, American writer (d. 1990)
 June 21 – Pok Shau-fu, Chinese journalist and politician (d. 2000)
 June 22 
 Infanta Beatriz of Spain, (d. 2002)
 Katherine Dunham, American dancer, choreographer, and songwriter (d. 2006)
 June 23 – Li Xiannian, President of the People's Republic of China (d. 1992)
 June 24 – William Penney, Baron Penney, English mathematician, physicist (d. 1991) 
 June 25 – Marguerite Viby, Danish actress (d. 2001)
 June 26 
 Mavis Thorpe Clark, Australian novelist, writer (d. 1999)
 Colonel Tom Parker, Dutch-born celebrity manager (d. 1997)
 Wolfgang Reitherman, German animator, director and producer (d. 1985)
 June 27 – Giuseppe Ballerio, Italian football player (d. 1999)
 June 28 – Eric Ambler, British author (d. 1998)
 June 30 – Juan Bosch, 43rd President of the Dominican Republic (d. 2001)

July 

 July 1 – Antonina Pirozhkova, Russian civil engineer, writer (d. 2010)
 July 2 – Gil English, American professional baseball third baseman (d. 1996)
 July 5 
 Douglas MacArthur II, American diplomat (d. 1997)
 Douglas Dodds-Parker, British politician and administrator (d. 2006)
 July 6
 Oscar Alende, Argentine politician (d. 1996) 
 Eric Reece, 32nd Premier of Tasmania (d. 1999)
 July 7
 Billy Herman, American second baseman and manager (d. 1992)
 Richard Turnbull, British colonial governor (d. 1998)
 Gottfried von Cramm, German tennis player (d. 1976)
 July 8 – Ike Petersen, American football back (d. 1995)
 July 9 
 Pavle Đurišić, Montenegrin Serb army commander (d. 1945)
 Juan Yustrich, Argentine football goalkeeper (d. 2002)
 July 11 
 Irene Hervey, American actress (d. 1998)
 Song Renqiong, Chinese political, military leader (d. 2005)
 July 12 
 Joe DeRita, American comedian (d. 1993)
 Motoichi Kumagai, Japanese photographer, illustrator (d. 2010)
 July 13 
 Raili Halttu, Finnish sprinter (d. 2006)
 Fritz Leonhardt, German structural engineer (d. 1999)
 Souphanouvong, 1st President of Laos (d. 1995)
 July 14
 Brian Shorland, New Zealand organic chemist (d. 1999)
 Alejandro Morera Soto, Costa Rican football player (d. 1995)
 July 15
 Hendrik Casimir, Dutch physicist (d. 2000)
 Vera Shlakman, American economist, professor (d. 2017)
 July 16 
 Aruna Asaf Ali, Indian independence activist (d. 1996)
 Teddy Buckner, American jazz trumpeter (d. 1994)
 Bernard Gadney, English rugby union footballer (d. 2000)
 July 18
 Andrei Gromyko, Soviet Minister for Foreign Affairs (d. 1989)
 Mohammed Daoud Khan, 5th Prime Minister of Afghanistan and 1st President of Afghanistan (d. 1978)
 Harriet Nelson, American singer, actress (d. 1994)
 July 19 – Balamani Amma, Indian poet (d. 2004)
 July 20
 Sigfrid Heyner, Swedish swimmer (d. 1995)
 Clyde Roberts, American college football player (d. 2004)
 July 21 – Egidio Armelloni, Italian gymnast (d. 1997)
 July 22 – Licia Albanese, Italian-born American operatic soprano (d. 2014)
 July 23 – John William Finn, American WWII hero (d. 2010)
 July 23 – Helen Martin, American actress (d. 2000)
 July 26 – Vivian Vance, American actress (d. 1979)
 July 28 – Malcolm Lowry, British novelist (Under the Volcano) (d. 1957)
 July 30 – C. Northcote Parkinson, British historian, author (d. 1993)

August 
 August 8
 Charles Lyttelton, 10th Viscount Cobham, English cricketer, politician and 9th Governor-General of New Zealand (d. 1977)
 Jack Renshaw, Australian politician, Premier of New South Wales (d. 1987)
 August 9
 Adam von Trott zu Solz, German lawyer, diplomat (d. 1944)
 Yūji Koseki, Japanese composer (d. 1989) 
 August 10 
 Leo Fender, American guitar inventor, manufacturer (d. 1991)
 Richard J. Hughes, American politician, 45th Governor of New Jersey, and Chief Justice of the New Jersey Supreme Court (d. 1992)
 Claude Thornhill, American pianist, arranger, composer, and bandleader (d. 1965)
 August 18 – Gordon Gunter, American marine biologist, fisheries scientist (d. 1998)
 August 25 – Michael Rennie, English actor (d. 1971)
 August 26 – Jim Davis, American actor (d. 1981)
 August 30 – Marguerite Allan, British actress (d. 1994)
 August 31 – Ferenc Fejtő, Hungarian-born French journalist, political scientist (d. 2008)

September to December

September 

 September 1 – E. Herbert Norman, Canadian diplomat (d. 1957)
 September 6 – Michael Gordon (film director), American actor and director (d. 1993)
 September 7 – Elia Kazan, Turkish-born film director (d. 2003)
 September 10 – Irakli Abashidze, Georgian poet, literary scholar, and politician (d. 1992)
 September 14 
 Peter Scott, British ornithologist and painter (d. 1989)
 Andreas Tzimas, Greek communist politician, Resistance leader (d. 1972)
 September 15 
 Phil Arnold, American actor (d. 1968)
 Jean Batten, New Zealand-born aviator (d. 1982)
 Jan van Aartsen, Dutch politician (d. 1992)
 September 17 – Sylvester Wiere, Austro-Hungarian-born American slapstick comedian, member of the Wiere Brothers (d. 1970)
 September 19 – Ferdinand Anton Ernst Porsche, Austrian auto designer, businessman (d. 1998)
 September 21 – Kwame Nkrumah, Ghanaian politician (d. 1972)
 September 24 – Carl Sigman, American songwriter (d. 2000)
 September 26 – Bill France, Sr., American race car driver, businessman, and co-founder of NASCAR (d. 1992)
 September 28 – Al Capp, American cartoonist (d. 1979)
 September 29 – Vasco Bergamaschi, Italian road racing cyclist (d. 1979)

October 

 October 1
 Margie Hines, American voice actress (d. 1985)
 Everett Sloane, American actor (d. 1965)
 October 4 – Murray Chotiner, American political consultant (d. 1974)
 October 7 – Tony Malinosky, American baseball player (d. 2011)
 October 8 – Piotr Jaroszewicz, Polish politician, 49th Prime Minister of Poland (d. 1992)
 October 10
Robert F. Boyle, American production designer, art director (d. 2010)
Max Simon Ehrlich, American writer (d. 1983)
 October 13 – Herblock, American editorial cartoonist (d. 2001)
 October 14 – Bernd Rosemeyer, German race car driver (d. 1938)
 October 17 – Cozy Cole, American jazz drummer (d. 1981)
 October 18 – Norberto Bobbio, Italian philosopher of law and political sciences (d. 2004)
 October 20 – Carla Laemmle, American actress (d. 2014)
 October 24 – Bill Carr, American athlete (d. 1966)
 October 25 – Whit Bissell, American actor (d. 1996)
 October 27 – Henry Townsend, American musician (d. 2006)
 October 28 – Francis Bacon, Irish-born British painter (d. 1992)

November 
 November 6 – Elizabeth Douglas-Home, Spouse of the Prime Minister of the United Kingdom (d. 1990)
 November 7 – Ruby Hurley, American civil rights activist (d. 1980)
 November 9 – Kay Thompson, American author, actress (d. 1998)
 November 10 – Paweł Jasienica, Polish historian (d. 1970)
 November 13 – Vincent Apap, Maltese sculptor (d. 2003)
 November 16 – Mirza Nasir Ahmad, Indian Islamic leader (d. 1982)
 November 18 – Johnny Mercer, American songwriter (d. 1976)
 November 22 – Mikhail Mil, Russian helicopter manufacturer (d. 1970)
 November 23 – Nigel Tranter, Scottish historian and novelist (d. 2000)
 November 24 – Gerhard Gentzen, German mathematician (d. 1945)
 November 26 – Eugène Ionesco, Romanian-born playwright (d. 1994)
 November 27 – James Agee, American writer (d. 1955)

December 

 December 2 – Marion Dönhoff, German journalist (d. 2002)
 December 5 – Bobbie Heine Miller, South African tennis player (d. 2016)
 December 7 – Arch Oboler, American actor, playwright, screenwriter, novelist, producer, and director (d. 1987)
 December 9 – Douglas Fairbanks Jr., American actor, naval officer (d. 2000)
 December 14 – Edward Lawrie Tatum, American geneticist, Nobel Prize laureate (d. 1975)
 December 20 
 Vagn Holmboe, Danish composer (d. 1996)
 Vakkom Majeed, Indian freedom fighter, politician (d. 2000)
 December 21 – Seichō Matsumoto, Japanese writer, journalist (d. 1992)
 December 22
 Alan Carney, American actor (d. 1973)
 Patricia Hayes, British character actress, comedian (d. 1998)
 December 27 – Henryk Jabłoński, President of Poland (d. 2003)
 December 29 – Thomas Beck, American actor (d. 1995)

Deaths

January 

 January 1 – Mollie Evelyn Moore Davis, American poet, writer, and editor (b. 1844)
 January 2 – Marta Abreu, Cuban philanthropist (b. 1845)
 January 6 – George Dixon, Canadian-born American boxer (b. 1870)
 January 8 – Harry Seeley, British palaeontologist (b. 1839)
 January 10
 Julia Colman, American temperance educator, activist, editor and writer (b. 1828)
 Charles Vernon Culver, American politician (b. 1830)
 January 11 – Joseph Wharton, American industrialist and educationist. (b. 1826)
 January 12 – Hermann Minkowski, German mathematician (b. 1864)
 January 14
Arthur William à Beckett, British journalist (b. 1844)
Zinovy Rozhestvensky, Russian admiral (b. 1848)
 January 15 – Arnold Janssen, German Roman Catholic priest and saint (b. 1837)
 January 22 – Hattie Tyng Griswold, American author (b. 1842)
 January 24 – Petre S. Aurelian, 19th Prime Minister of Romania (b. 1833)
 January 27 – Benoît-Constant Coquelin, French theatrical actor (b. 1841)
 January 30 – Martha Finley, American teacher, author (b. 1828)

February 

 February 5 – Alexandre Saint-Yves d'Alveydre, French occultist (b. 1842)
 February 8 – Catulle Mendès, French poet (b. 1841)
 February 13 – Hans Peter Jørgen Julius Thomsen, Danish chemist (b. 1826)
 February 17 
 Geronimo, Apache leader (b. 1829)
 Grand Duke Vladimir Alexandrovich of Russia, Russian army officer and nobleman (b. 1847)
 February 20 – Paul Ranson, French painter (b. 1864)
 February 26 
 Caran d'Ache, French political cartoonist (b. 1858)
 Hermann Ebbinghaus, German psychologist (b. 1850)

March 
 March 6 – Gustaf af Geijerstam, Swedish novelist (b. 1858)
 March 13 – William Jackson Palmer, American founder of Colorado Springs (b. 1836)
 March 16 – Wilbraham Egerton, 1st Earl Egerton, chairman of the Manchester Ship Canal (b. 1832)
 March 24 – John Millington Synge, Irish playwright (b. 1871)
 March 25 – Ruperto Chapí, Spanish composer (b. 1854)

April 

 April 1 – Sir Marshal Clarke, British colonial administrator (b. 1841)
 April 3 – Pascual Cervera y Topete, Spanish admiral (b. 1839)
 April 8 – Helena Modjeska, Polish actress (b. 1840)
 April 10 – Algernon Charles Swinburne, English poet (b. 1837)
 April 13 – Sir Donald Currie, British shipping magnate (b. 1825)
 April 14 – Miguel Ángel Juárez Celman, 10th President of Argentina (b. 1844)
 April 19 – Signe Rink, Greenland-born Danish writer, ethnologist (b. 1836)
 April 28 – Frederick Holbrook, Vermont governor (b. 1813)

May 

 May 2 – Manuel Amador Guerrero, 1st President of Panama (b. 1833)
 May 4 – Helen Marr Hurd, American teacher and poet (b. 1839)
 May 7 – Alexis Toth, Russian Orthodox church leader and saint (b. 1853)
 May 9 – Augusta Jane Evans, American author of Southern literature (b. 1835)
 May 10 – Futabatei Shimei, Japanese author, translator (b. 1864)
 May 12 
 Sir Hugh Gough, British general, Victoria Cross recipient (b. 1833)
 Bertha Townsend, American tennis champion (b. 1869)
 May 17 – Helge Alexander Haugan, American banking executive (b. 1847)
 May 18
 Isaac Albéniz, Spanish composer (b. 1860)
 George Meredith, English novelist, poet (b. 1828)
 May 20 – Ernest Hogan, African-American dancer, musician, and comedian (b. 1865)

June 

 June 10 – Edward Everett Hale, American author and historian (b. 1822)
 June 14 – Afonso Pena, 6th President of Brazil (b. 1847)
 June 24 – Sarah Orne Jewett, American writer (b. 1849)

July 
 July 8 – Gaston, Marquis de Galliffet, French general (b. 1830)
 July 9 – Kasimir Felix Graf von Badeni, 13th Minister-President of Cisleithania (b. 1846)
 July 11 – Simon Newcomb, Canadian-American astronomer, mathematician (b. 1835)
 July 18 – Carlos, Duke of Madrid (b. 1848)
 July 19 – Arai Ikunosuke, Japanese samurai (b. 1836)
 July 20 – Johanna Mestorf, German archaeologist (b. 1828)
 July 22 – Detlev von Liliencron, German poet (b. 1844)
 July 23 – Sir Frederick Holder, 19th Premier of South Australia (b. 1850)

August 

 August 5 – Miguel Antonio Caro, Colombian political leader (b. 1843)
 August 8 – Mary MacKillop, Australian Roman Catholic nun and saint (b. 1842)
 August 14 – William Stanley, British inventor, engineer (b. 1829)
 August 15 – Euclides da Cunha, Brazilian author (b. 1866)
 August 22 – Henry Radcliffe Crocker, English dermatologist (b. 1846)
 August 25 – Besarion Jughashvili, Georgian cobbler, father of Joseph Stalin (b. 1850)
 August 27 – Emil Christian Hansen, Danish fermentation physiologist (b. 1842)

September 
 September 2 – Louis Delacenserie, Belgian architect (b. 1838)
 September 4 – Clyde Fitch, American dramatist (b. 1865)
 September 5 – Louis Bouveault, French chemist (b. 1864)
 September 7 – Eugène Lefebvre, pioneer French aviator (b. 1878)
 September 18 – Grigore Tocilescu, Romanian historian, archaeologist, epigrapher and folklorist (b. 1850)
 September 22 – Ferdinand Ferber, French Army officer, pioneer aviator (b. 1862)
 September 27 – Gyula Donáth, Hungarian sculptor (b. 1850)
 September 29 – Vladimir Vidrić, Croatian poet (b. 1875)

October 

 October 7 – William Thomas Pipes, Canadian politician, 6th Premier of Nova Scotia (b. 1850)
 October 13 – Francisco Ferrer, Spanish anarchist (executed) (b. 1859)
 October 17 – Sagen Ishizuka, Japanese physician and dietitian (b. 1850) 
 October 19 – Cesare Lombroso, Italian criminologist, physician (b. 1835)
 October 24 – Rufus W. Peckham, Associate Justice of the Supreme Court of the United States (b. 1838)
 October 26 – Itō Hirobumi, 1st Prime Minister of Japan (assassinated) (b. 1841)

November 

 November 9 – William Powell Frith, English painter (b. 1819)
 November 14 – Joshua Slocum, Canadian-born American seaman and adventurer (b. 1844)
 November 18 – Renée Vivien, British-born American poet (b. 1877)

December 

 December 10 – Red Cloud, Sioux warrior (b. 1822)
 December 14 – Agustí Querol Subirats, Spanish sculptor (b. 1860)
 December 15 – Francisco Tárrega, Spanish guitarist, composer (b. 1852)
 December 17 – King Leopold II of Belgium (b. 1835)
 December 16
 Adelaide of Löwenstein-Wertheim-Rosenberg, Queen consort of Portugal (b. 1831)
 Lina Morgenstern, German writer, educator, feminist and pacifist (b. 1830)
 December 18 – Grand Duke Michael Nikolaevich, Russian royal (b. 1832)
 December 26 – Frederic Remington, American cowboy artist, sculptor (b. 1864)

Date unknown 

 Martha Foster Crawford, American writer and missionary (b. 1830)
 Gideon T. Stewart, American educator, politician (b. 1824)

Nobel Prizes 

 Physics – Guglielmo Marconi and Karl Ferdinand Braun
 Chemistry – Wilhelm Ostwald
 Medicine – Emil Theodor Kocher
 Literature – Selma Lagerlöf
 Peace – Auguste Marie François Beernaert and Paul-Henri-Benjamin d'Estournelles de Constant

References

Primary sources and year books
 New International year book: 1909

Further reading
 Gilbert, Martin. A History of the Twentieth Century: Volume 1 1900-1933 (1997); global coverage of politics, diplomacy and warfare; pp 185 – 205.